Joyce Omboy Semacio (born 29 January 2000) is a Filipino footballer who plays as a forward for the Philippines women's national team.

Early life and education
Hailing from Davao City, Joyce Omboy Semacio was born on January 29, 2000. She used to attend Philippine College of Technology for her secondary studies and now studies at Miriam College Katipunan where she is the sole female scholar for the sport of football.

Career
Joyce Semacio has represented youth sides in the Davao region. At the 2013 Philippine Football Federation (PFF) Mindanao Regional Festival of Football, Semacio helped the Davao FA team win the tournament. She played for the Davao Region Athletic Association (DAVRAA) football team at the 11th Del Monte Football Cup in 2015 helping the regional team win the tournament. She was named as MVP of the football tournament. She also played for the Davao City futsal team at the 2015 and 2017 DAVRAA Meets.

International career
Semacio has been part of the youth system of the Philippine women's national team. She has played for the Philippine U14 and U16 women's teams. She has included in the Philippine roster for the 2014 AFC U-14 Girls Regional Championship (Southeast Asia) and 2018 AFC U-16 Championship qualifiers in September 2017, and was named as the MVP for the former in which she led the national team to a second place finish.

Semacio debuted for the senior team in 2018 AFF Women's Championship in the Philippines' 0–4 defeat to Myanmar coming in as a substitute for Anicka Castañeda in the 73rd minute. She made her first start for the national team in the Singapore match where she scored her first goal in the 3–0 win against Singapore.

International goals
Scores and results list the Philippines' goal tally first.

References

Living people
Filipino women's footballers
Philippines women's international footballers
Women's association football midfielders
Sportspeople from Davao City
2000 births